Passport is a United States-based payment service provider headquartered in Wilmington, Delaware with offices in Charlotte, North Carolina. Passport provides an enterprise software platform for cities, transit agencies, universities, and private operators in the parking and transportation industries throughout the U.S. and Canada. Passport’s primary applications include mobile payments for parking and mobile ticketing for transit operations. Passport's software allows municipalities and private operators to charge users for parking without hardware payment stations.

References

2010 establishments in North Carolina
Payment service providers